Kesmeburun is a village in the District of Yumurtalık, Adana Province, Turkey.

References

Villages in Yumurtalık District